Events in the year 2023 in Qatar.

Incumbents

Events 
Ongoing — COVID-19 pandemic in Qatar

 March: The Fifth UN Conference on the Least Developed Countries is held in Doha, Qatar.

Sports 

 May: The 2023 World Judo Championships are scheduled to be held in Doha, Qatar.
 The 2023 AFC Asian Cup is scheduled to be held in Qatar.

References 

 

 
2020s in Qatar
Years of the 21st century in Qatar
Qatar
Qatar